One competitor from Italy was present at the 1896 Summer Olympics.  He competed in shooting.  Italy was one of four nations present that won no medals; Sweden, Chile and Bulgaria were the others.  Italy's competitor, Rivabella, entered one event in the shooting program.

A second Italian was present in Athens. Carlo Airoldi had walked most of the way from Milan, but was disqualified because he had received prize money in athletics events and was therefore not an amateur.

Shooting

Rivabella was somewhere between 14th and 41st place, with a score less than 845.

References
  (Digitally available at )
  (Excerpt available at )
 

Nations at the 1896 Summer Olympics
1896
Olympics